Esophageal diseases can derive from congenital conditions, or they can be acquired later in life.

Many people experience a burning sensation in their chest occasionally, caused by stomach acids refluxing into the esophagus, normally called heartburn. Extended exposure to heartburn may erode the lining of the esophagus, leading potentially to Barrett's esophagus which is associated with an increased risk of adenocarcinoma most commonly found in the distal one-third of the esophagus.

Some people also experience a sensation known as globus esophagus, where it feels as if a ball is lodged in the lower part of the esophagus.

The following are additional diseases and conditions that affect the esophagus:

 Achalasia
 Acute esophageal necrosis
 Barrett's esophagus
 Boerhaave syndrome
 Caustic injury to the esophagus
 Chagas disease
 Diffuse esophageal spasm
 Esophageal atresia and tracheoesophageal fistula
 Esophageal cancer
 Esophageal dysphagia
 Esophageal varices
 Esophageal web
 Esophagitis
 GERD
 Hiatus hernia
 Killian–Jamieson diverticulum
 Mallory–Weiss syndrome
 Neurogenic dysphagia
 Nutcracker esophagus
 Schatzki's ring
 Zenker's diverticulum

References

External links 

 Esophageal and Swallowing Disorders, Merck & Company Inc.

Esophagus disorders